Douglas Court (March 3, 1933 – March 25, 2019) was a Canadian figure skater. He was the 1954–55 silver and 1956 national bronze medalist.

Results

References

 skatabase
 Doug Court obituary

Canadian male single skaters
1933 births
2019 deaths